Dmitry Leonidovich Horvat (July 25, 1858, Kremenchug, Poltava Governorate, Russian Empire – May 16, 1937, Beiping) was a Russian lieutenant general, a railway engineer by training, over the years led various sections of the railways of the Russian Empire, one of the leaders of the White movement.

Biography
Born in a family of hereditary nobles of the Kherson Governorate. The father – the magistrate judge Leonid Nikolaevich Horvat – was the great-grandson of General Jovan Horvat, who stood at the origins of New Serbia. Mother – Baroness Maria Pilar von Pilhau – one of the daughters of General Karl Pilar von Pilhau, great-granddaughter of Field Marshal Mikhail Kutuzov.

In 1875 he entered the Nikolaevsk Engineering School, which he graduated in 1878 in the 1st category and in the rank of second lieutenant was assigned to the Engineer Life Guards Battalion. He participated in the Russo-Turkish War of 1877–78, from May to September 1878 he was on the Balkan Peninsula in the village of Stefano, regularly making business trips to the engineering part to take gunpowder, electroplating (electric) carts and the like to the city of Ruschuk and other cities.

In October 1881, he passed the entrance examinations and entered the junior class of the Nikolaev Academy of Engineering, where he was expelled two years later due to "domestic circumstances", returned to his battalion, and was engaged in teaching in the training team at the battalion.

In March 1885, he was promoted to lieutenant and in June was assigned to the construction of the Trans-Caspian military railway, having been appointed to the position of official on special assignments under General Mikhail Annenkov, head of the road construction. The Trans-Caspian Military Railway is notable for the fact that it became the first railway in the world, built in the period 1880–88, in the zone of moving sands. Initially, its construction was intended for the strategic needs of the military department of the Russian Empire, and only from 1899, the road passed to the Ministry of Railways.

Laying of the railway track superstructure was carried out by two railway battalions. As the road was built and stations opened, all posts in the service of the movement, thrust, and repair were also performed by the officers of these battalions: officers, non-commissioned officers, and privates. In order to complete all the work and carry out the operation of the railway track in the shortest possible time, there were not enough people, so Croatian, being a special assignment officer at the construction manager, had to do the work of the foreman, the traveling foreman, and even the locomotive engineer.

Thanks to his natural talents and exceptional service qualities, he quickly moved in the service, occupied a number of posts. In 1889, when the railway line was built to the city of Samarkand, he was appointed head of the operating distance of the Samarkand section of the Trans-Caspian military railway, in April of the same year he was promoted to the rank of stabs-kapitan, in 1894 he was promoted to captain.

In 1895, he was assigned to the Ussuri Krai, for the construction of the Ussuri railway, as the head of the 1st Ussuri battalion.

In May 1898, promoted to colonel. In September 1896, he was appointed the head of the South Ussuriisk railway, leaving his previous post. From April 1899 – Acting Head of the Trans-Caspian Railway. In November 1902, he received an offer to take the post of manager of the then Chinese Eastern Railway (CER). From 1903 – head of construction, then until April 27, 1918 – manager of the CER. At the same time, he was at the disposal of the Minister of Finance (as the head of the department in charge of the CER).

Promoted in the rank of Major general (promotion 1904; seniority November 26, 1906; for distinction), then in the rank of lieutenant general (promotion December 6, 1911; seniority November 26, 1912; for distinction).

After the February Revolution of 1917 – Commissioner of the Provisional Government on the CER.

After the October Revolution of 1917, in the alienation zone, the CER was still in full order, life was ensured for everyone, and everyone lived in satiety and in peace. People believed that as long as Horvat was there, everyone would be protected from all kinds of misfortunes. The strip of alienation was then called "happy, blessed Horvatia", but it turned out, thanks to the disintegration in Russia of the central supreme state power, as if completely independent, granted to its own forces.

General Horvat did not long agree on general persuasion to take upon himself the heavy burden of exercising the authority of the supreme power, but finally, he decided and on July 10, 1918, declared himself the Temporary Ruler until the Russian national sovereignty was restored. In this high rank and in this responsible post he remained until September 13, 1918, when, after long and difficult negotiations, he recognized the Provisional Siberian Government, to which he transferred his sovereign powers, resigning as the Temporary Ruler and remaining High Commissioner for the Far East, with the subordination of all the troops and military fleets of the Far East. In this post, he continued to remain when the Siberian Government transferred, in turn, its authority to the Provisional All-Russian Government formed in the city of Ufa, as well as when the designated Government fell, and the entire government passed to the Supreme Ruler – Admiral Alexander Kolchak.

On August 31, 1919, with the appointment of General Rozanov as the Chief of the Amur Region, General Horvat returned from Vladivostok to Harbin. There he remained at the head of the administration of a vast territory of the railway alienation line until the "Karakhan note" appeared, in which the Bolshevik government refused free of any Russian rights to the CER.

Emigration
After the "note of Karakhan" completely retired from the railway and left in 1920 for Beijing. Was engaged in political and social activities. From 1921 to 1924 – Advisor to the Society of the Chinese Eastern Railway in Beijing. Since 1924 – Chairman of the Department of the Russian All-Military Union in China. He remained there until his death, being the officially recognized head of the Russian emigration in the Far East. Working tirelessly to protect the rights of emigration and to arrange its well-being, General Horvat, thanks to his authority and his entire past, was able to help his fellow countrymen in many ways.

He was buried at one of the walls of the temple of the Martyrs in the Beijing spiritual mission.

Family
Wife – Camilla Albertovna Benois (1879 – July 4, 1959, Vancouver) – the daughter of the architect Albert Benois.
Son – Dmitry Dmitrievich Horvat, wife – Olga Olegovna (born Isaeva);
Daughter – Evdokia Dmitrievna Williams.

Military ranks
Entered the service (September 1, 1875);
Podpraporshchik (April 16, 1878);
Praporshchik (May 11, 1879);
Poruchik (March 24, 1885);
Stabs-kapitan (April 6, 1889);
Captain (August 30, 1894);
Colonel (May 17, 1896);
Major general (November 26, 1906);
Lieutenant general (November 26, 1912).

Awards
Order of Saint Stanislaus, 3rd class (1889);
Order of Saint Anna, 3rd class (1893);
Order of Saint Stanislaus, 2nd class (1895);
Order of Saint Anna, 2nd class (1899);
Order of Saint Vladimir, 3rd class (1902);
Order of Saint Stanislaus, 1st class (1905);
Order of Saint Anna, 1st class (1905);
Order of Saint Vladimir, 2nd class (1910);
Order of the White Eagle (1915).

foreign:

Golden Star of the Order of Noble Bukhara, 2nd class (1892);
Tunisian Officer's Cross of Order of Glory (1897);
Prussian Order of the Crown, 2nd class (1900);
Golden Star of the Order of Noble Bukhara, 1st class (1901).

See also
 Jovan Horvat
 Ivan Adamovich
 Ilya Mikhailovich Duka
 Mikhail Miloradovich
 Peter Tekeli
 Jovan Albanez
 Jovan Šević
 Semyon Zorich
 Anto Gvozdenović
 Marko Ivanovich Voinovich
 Matija Zmajević
 Simeon Piščević
 Simeon Končarević

References

External links

 Valeria Burkova. Dmitry Leonidovich Horvat – First Head of the Road // The Far Eastern Highway Newspaper – №32 (dated August 17, 2007); №33 (dated August 24, 2007); №34 (dated August 31, 2007).
Imperial Renaissance Foundation. Professor Nadezhda Ablova. "Dmitry Leonidovich Horvat from the history of Russian emigration in China".
Site "Asian Library". Article "History of the CER and Russian emigration in China (first half of the 20th century)".
Vadim Perminov. Dmitry Horvat // Site "Transbaikalia Encyclopedia" (www.encycl.chita.ru)
Glukharyov. In memory of General Dmitry Horvat // "Sentinel". The liaison body of the Russian army and the national movement abroad. Brussels, July 5, 1937. – No 193. – Page 20.

1858 births
1937 deaths
Recipients of the Order of the White Eagle (Russia)
Recipients of the Order of St. Vladimir, 2nd class
Recipients of the Order of St. Anna, 1st class
Recipients of the Order of Saint Stanislaus (Russian), 1st class
Recipients of the Order of St. Vladimir, 3rd class
Recipients of the Order of St. Anna, 2nd class
Recipients of the Order of Saint Stanislaus (Russian), 2nd class
Recipients of the Order of St. Anna, 3rd class
Recipients of the Order of Saint Stanislaus (Russian), 3rd class
Military personnel of the Russo-Turkish War (1877–1878)
People of the Russian Civil War
White Russian emigrants to China
Burials in Beijing
Russian people of Serbian descent